Sombreffe is a municipality of Wallonia located in the province of Namur, Belgium.

On 1 January 2014 the municipality had 8,226 inhabitants. The total area is 35.78 km², giving a population density of 230 inhabitants per km².

The municipality is composed of the following districts: Boignée, Ligny, Sombreffe and Tongrinne.

See also
 List of protected heritage sites in Sombreffe

References

External links 
 
  (in French)

Municipalities of Namur (province)
Battle of Ligny locations